SSR-180,575 is a drug which acts as a selective agonist at the peripheral benzodiazepine receptor, also known as the mitochondrial 18 kDa translocator protein or TSPO. It has been shown to have neuroprotective and cardioprotective effects and to stimulate steroidogenesis of pregnenolone in the brain, which may be linked to its neuroprotective action.

See also
 Emapunil

References 

TSPO ligands
Indoles